Claypool is a census-designated place (CDP) in Gila County, Arizona, United States. The population was 1,538 at the 2010 census, down from 1,794 at the 2000 census.  It was named after W. D. Claypool, a member of both the State House of Representatives and State Senate in the 1910s and 1920s.

Geography
Claypool is located in southern Gila County at  (33.408626, -110.847532), between Miami to the west and Globe, the county seat, to the east. U.S. Route 60 runs along the northern edge of the community.

Climate
According to the Köppen Climate Classification system, Claypool has a warm-summer Mediterranean climate, abbreviated "Csa" on climate maps.

Demographics

As of the census of 2000, there were 1,794 people, 683 households, and 486 families residing in the CDP. The racial makeup of the CDP was 78.5% White, 1.0% Black or African American, 1.6% Native American, 0.1% Asian, 15.8% from other races, and 3.1% from two or more races. 41.0% of the population were Hispanic or Latino of any race.

There were 683 households, out of which 29.9% had children under the age of 18 living with them, 55.5% were married couples living together, 11.3% had a female householder with no husband present, and 28.8% were non-families. 24.6% of all households were made up of individuals, and 13.2% had someone living alone who was 65 years of age or older. The average household size was 2.63 and the average family size was 3.14.

In the CDP, the population was spread out, with 27.8% under the age of 18, 7.3% from 18 to 24, 23.2% from 25 to 44, 25.9% from 45 to 64, and 15.7% who were 65 years of age or older. The median age was 39 years. For every 100 females, there were 93.3 males. For every 100 females age 18 and over, there were 89.6 males.

The median income for a household in the CDP was $34,196, and the median income for a family was $47,593. Males had a median income of $33,571 versus $23,661 for females. The per capita income for the CDP was $16,246. About 6.4% of families and 12.1% of the population were below the poverty line, including 16.4% of those under age 18 and 15.0% of those age 65 or over.

Gallery
 The Claypool Tunnel – The abandoned tunnel was built in 1926 in the Superstition Mountains, as part of the old US Hwy 60 system.

Notable person

Ed Pastor, Democratic member of the United States House of Representatives

References

Census-designated places in Gila County, Arizona